St Martin's GAA is a Gaelic Athletic Association club based in the Ballyfoyle/Coon/Muckalee area of County Kilkenny, Ireland. The catchment area is roughly comprehended by the ancient barony of Fassadinin.

The team colour is red with a green sash. The club grounds are Comerford Park, Coon 

The club won the All-Ireland Senior Club Hurling Championship in 1985.

History
The club was formed in 1982 following an amalgamation of the clubs in the parishes Muckalee, Ballyfoyle, and Coon.

The club's first officers were: chairman, Billy Costigan; vice-chairman, John Walsh; joint secretaries Patsy Murphy, Paul Kinsella; joint treasurers, Tom Dowling and Jimmy Maher; senior selectors: Billy Costigan, Patsy Murphy, Dinny Carrigan, Mick Somers, Tom Dowling.

Former Laois senior hurling team manager Séamus Plunkett took over as manager of St Martin's in November 2022.

Honours

 All-Ireland Senior Club Hurling Championships: 1
 1985
 Leinster Senior Club Hurling Championships: 1
 1985
 Kilkenny Senior Hurling Championships: 1
 1984
 Kilkenny Intermediate Hurling Championships: 3
 1973, 1975, 2002
 Kilkenny Junior Hurling Championships: 2
 1967, 1974
 Kilkenny Special Junior A Hurling Championships: 2
 1984, 2007
 Kilkenny Special Junior B Hurling Championships: 1
 2009
 All-Ireland Junior B Club Hurling Championships: 1
 2010
 Kilkenny Under 21 Hurling Championships: 1
 2007
 Kilkenny Minor Hurling Championships: 1
 2005

All Stars

Eamon Morrisey
1990

Notable players
 Dermot Lawler
 Mick Lawler
 John Maher
 Eamon Morrissey
 John Mulhall

All Ireland Champions

The following is the team that lined out for St. Martin’s in the All-Ireland Senior Club Hurling Championship final on March 24, 1985:

See also

Kilkenny GAA

References

Sources

 O'Neill, Gerry. (2005), Kilkenny GAA Bible. Produced by Kilkenny GAA Yearbook Committee.
 Somers, Michael. (2006), The Club. Produced by Kilkenny Voice.

External links 

 
 

 

Gaelic games clubs in County Kilkenny
Hurling clubs in County Kilkenny
1982 establishments in Ireland